The Town of Erie is a Statutory Town located in Weld and Boulder counties, Colorado, United States. The town population was 30,038 at the 2020 United States Census, a +65.64% increase since the 2010 United States Census. At the 2020 census, 17,387 (58%) Erie residents lived in Weld County and 12,651 (42%) lived in Boulder County. Erie is a part of the Denver-Aurora, CO Combined Statistical Area and the Front Range Urban Corridor.

Erie is located just west of Interstate 25, with easy access to Interstate 70, Denver International Airport and Colorado's entire Front Range. Erie's Planning Area spans , extending from the north side of State Highway 52 south to State Highway 7, and between US 287 on the west and Interstate 25 to the east. Erie is approximately 35 minutes from Denver International Airport, 25 minutes from Denver and 20 minutes from Boulder.

The town was named after Erie, Pennsylvania, the former home of early settler Richard Van Valkenburg.

History 
Although it was settled and named in 1867, Erie was not officially incorporated until November 16, 1874. The first board of trustees consisted of five permanent and prominent members of the community; George Meller, Richard Van Valkenburg, John T. Williams, Joseph J. Wharton and John A. Rowe. Erie was unique among local coal mining towns because the local coal miners actually owned land or houses in town, instead of setting up temporary camps.

Coal was discovered in the region in the 1860s, and by 1870, railway service was established by the Denver-Pacific Spur Railroad. In 1871, the Denver & Boulder Valley Railroad was built through the area, connecting Boulder and Brighton. The railroad made it much easier to transport coal to the surrounding communities and to Denver, helping the town grow quickly. Although the locals were mining coal in the surrounding area starting in the 1860s, the first official mine in Erie opened in 1876; operated by Ira Austin.

The first school was established in 1874, with 33 students enrolling. The first school building was erected in 1881, with 100 students enrolled. In 1907, the school was replaced by the larger brick Lincoln School, which soon became inadequate due to the town's growth, and four new rooms had to be added in 1920. The over crowding was alleviated in 1929, with the construction of the new high school. Eventually, the Lincoln School was abandoned all together, and a new elementary school was constructed in 1966.

The first church was established in 1883, the Welsh Presbyterian Church, with services conducted in Welsh. By 1888, there was a United Methodist Church and in 1898, the St. Scholasticas Catholic Church was dedicated.  In 1884, the first newspaper was founded by Charles D. Bell; called the Erie-Canfield Independent, it continued publishing until 1896. The Erie Herald was established in 1907 and published for far longer than other short lived newspapers, serving the community until 1948.

Erie was one of the only "wet" towns in the area and by 1895, boasted eleven saloons on Briggs Street. This resulted in the need for a jail, constructed in 1876, and a constable. The earliest known constable in Erie was B.C. "Bud" Pitchford. Erie was hit by major floods in 1890, 1921, and 1972. The floods devastated the town, and a dike was built around nearby Coal Creek after the 1972 flood. Erie was also hard-hit by the Panic of 1893 and the Great Depression, the latter of which led to a decline in coal output. Demand for coal dropped after World War II, and most of the mines in the Erie area were closed by 1960, with the Eagle Mine closing in 1978.

Geography
It is bordered to the south by the city of Broomfield and to the southwest by the city of Lafayette. Interstate 25 forms part of the eastern border of the town, leading south  to downtown Denver and north  to Fort Collins. Erie is served by Exit 232 off I-25.

At the 2020 United States Census, the town had a total area of  including  of water.

Demographics

As of the 2010 Census there were 18,186 people in the Town of Erie.  According to the 2009 American Community Profile, the racial makeup of the town was 90.6% White, 0.3% African American, 0.1% Native American, 4.1% Asian, 0.00% Pacific Islander, 2.4% from other races, and 2.6% from two or more races. Hispanic or Latino of any race were 9.7% of the population.

According to the Town of Erie Community Development Department, there were 6,485 households.  According to the US Census the average household size was 2.91.

Population: Under 5 years - 9.6%, 5 to 9 years - 10.3%, 10 to 14 years - 7.4%, 15 to 19 years - 5.4%, 20 to 24 years - 2.7%, 25 to 29 years - 4.9%, 30 to 34 years - 8.1%, 35 to 39 years - 10.4%, 40 to 44 years - 9.8%, 45 to 49 years - 8.5%, 50 to 54 years - 7.25%, 55 to 59 years - 5.5%, 60 to 64 years - 4.5%, 65 to 69 years - 2.5%, 70 to 74 years - 1.4%, 75 to 79 years - 0.9%, 80 to 84 years - 0.5%, 85 and older - 0.35%.

The median income for a household in the town was $99,804, and the median income for a family was $108,058.  The per capita income for the town was $38,965.

Government

The Board of Trustees serves as the legislative and governing body of the town of Erie and is responsible for establishing town policies and goals. The board has the authority to adopt laws, ordinances and resolutions as needed to conduct the business of the town, and by ordinance may enter into contracts or intergovernmental agreements to furnish, receive services or to provide for cooperative service delivery.

Appointed by and serving at the pleasure of the Board of Trustees, the Town Administrator is the chief operating and administrative officer of the town and is responsible for providing professional leadership in the administration and execution of policies and objectives formulated by the board.

Erie Municipal Airport (EIK) is owned and operated by the Town of Erie and is located on Colorado Highway 7, a little over three miles west of Interstate 25.

Arts and culture
There is an active group of artists in Erie; the Arts Coalition of Erie (a 501(c)(3) represents about 70 artists, or approximately 60% of the artists in town. There are good venues for art at the Erie Community Center and High Plains Library, and shows change about every two months.

The Art Center of Erie (known as the A.C.E.) at 625 Pierce Street in Old Town Erie is open for visual and performing arts programs and is operated by the Arts Coalition of Erie. Classes and events are held year round at the site (an old children's library owned by the Town of Erie) leased by the Arts Coalition of Erie.

Transport
The town has an airport, the Erie Municipal Airport.
Yet there are no major highway or interstate that goes through Erie, I-25, State Highway 7, and State Highway 52 are the main transportation on road for Erie.

See also

Colorado
Bibliography of Colorado
Index of Colorado-related articles
Outline of Colorado
List of counties in Colorado
List of municipalities in Colorado
List of places in Colorado
List of statistical areas in Colorado
Front Range Urban Corridor
North Central Colorado Urban Area
Denver-Aurora, CO Combined Statistical Area
Boulder, CO Metropolitan Statistical Area
Greeley, CO Metropolitan Statistical Area

References

External links

Town of Erie website
CDOT map of the Town of Erie

 
Towns in Boulder County, Colorado
Towns in Weld County, Colorado
Towns in Colorado
Denver metropolitan area